Ji Gong (22 December 1130 – 16 May 1209), born Li Xiuyuan and also known as "Chan Master Daoji" was a Chan Buddhist monk who lived in the Southern Song. He purportedly possessed supernatural powers through Taoist practices, which he used to help the poor and stand up to injustice. However, he was also known for his wild and eccentric behavior, who didn't follow Buddhist monastic rules by consuming alcohol and meat. By the time of his death, Ji Gong had become a legend in Chinese culture and a deity in Chinese folk religion. He is mentioned by Buddhists in folktales and kōans, and sometimes invoked by oracles to assist in worldly affairs.

History
Originally named Li Xiuyuan, Jìgōng (济公) was born to a former military advisor Li Maochun and his wife Lady Wang in 1130 CE (other accounts say 1148). After the death of his parents at the age of 18, Li was sent to Hangzhou and was ordained as a monk in Lingyin Temple, a temple of the Chán (Zen) school. He was mentored by the Vinaya master Huiyuan and was given the monastic name Dàojì (道济, which could be interpreted as "Helper on the Way"). Unlike traditional Buddhist monks, Dàojì did not like following traditional monastic codes. He had a penchant for openly eating meat and drinking wine; his robes were often tattered and dirty from traveling from place to place, and he stumbled clumsily as walked from intoxication. However, Dàojì was kindhearted and was always ready to lend a helping hand to ordinary people. He would often treat the sick and fight against injustice. The monks, bewildered and fed up with his behavior, expelled Dàojì from the monastery. From then on, Dàojì roamed the streets and helped people whenever he could.

According to legend, while cultivating Buddhist practices, Dàojì attained supernatural powers. Many who noticed his eccentric yet benevolent and compassionate nature began to think that he was the emanation of a bodhisattva, or the incarnation of an arhat. He was widely recognized by people as the incarnation of the Dragon Subduing Arhat (降龍羅漢, Xiánglóng Luóhàn), one of the Eighteen Arhats. Later he became known as Jìgōng (济公, "the Honorable Helper"), a title of respect derived from his monastic name, Dàojì (道济).

Toward the end of his life, he stayed at Jingci Temple, and passed away on the 14th day of the 5th lunar month (May 16th, 1209), around the age of 79 (or 61 according to other chronicles). Later syncretic Taoism began to revere Jìgōng as a deity. Not long after that, Chinese Buddhist institutions began to recognize his compassionate efforts, and was incorporated into Chinese Buddhism. He is also featured as an interlocutor in many classic kōans of the Chán (Zen) school.

Since at least the 1869s, mediums in China have claimed to receive texts from Jìgōng through spirit writing, later called Fuji (扶乩/扶箕 fújī). These messages led to a further development of Jìgōng worship, which was actively promoted by the monk Fǎlún (法輪) at Hupao Temple (虎跑寺, Hǔpǎo Sì) in Hangzhou, where Jìgōng’s grave is located. The channeled messages gradually acquired a moralistic tone, recommending charitable activities. Jìgōng’s messages received through 'spirit writing' played a role in the establishment of the Benevolent Relief Society (救濟善會, Jiùjì Shànhuì), whose leaders later participated in the foundation of the Red Cross Society of China.

A new Buddhist movement, the Hong Kong-based Tung Cheng Yuen Buddhist Association, worship Jìgōng. Yiguandao has also adopted him into their pantheon of deities, citing Zhang Tianran, contemporary founder of the Yiguandao, as his reincarnation.

Depiction

Ji Gong can usually be seen smiling in tattered monastic robes, and usually carries a bottle of wine in his right hand, and a fan in his left hand. He wears a hat with the Chinese character Fo, meaning "Buddha". He can also be seen holding his shoes in his right hand. Because of his carefree nature, he is rarely ever shown with a serious facial expression.

In popular culture
Ji Gong has been portrayed by numerous actors in films and television series from as early as 1939.

Books
Chinese novel Ji Gong Quan Zhuang by Guo Xiaoting. Adventures of the Mad Monk Ji Gong: The Drunken Wisdom of China's Most Famous Chan Buddhist Monk, Guo Xiaoting; John Robert Shaw trs., Tuttle Publishing, 2014.

Films
 The Living Buddha, a 1939 Hong Kong film starring Yee Chau-sui.
 Ji Gong, Reincarnated Buddha, 1949 Hong Kong film starring Yee Chau-sui.
 How the Monk Chai Kung Thrice Insulted Wah Wan-Lung, a 1950 Hong Kong film starring Yee Chau-sui.
 The Mischievous Magic Monk, a 1954 Hong Kong film starring Hung Boh.
 A New Tale of the Monk Jigong (A New Tale of the Monk Jigong), a 1954 Hong Kong film starring Leung Sing-bo.
 Ji Gong Sets the Fire on the Impenetrable Pi-pa Spirit, a 1958 Hong Kong film starring Leung Sing-bo.
 Ji Gong, the Living Buddha, a 1964 Hong Kong film starring Sun Ma Sze Tsang.
 A Modern Ji Gong, a 1965 Hong Kong film starring Sun Ma Sze Tsang.
 Ji Gong Raids the Courtroom, a 1965 Hong Kong film starring Sun Ma Sze Tsang.
 Ji Gong Is After the Demon, a 1965 Hong Kong film starring Sun Ma Sze Tsang.
 Ji Gong and the 8 Immortals, a 1966 Hong Kong film starring Sun Ma Sze Tsang.
 The Magnificent Monk, a 1969 Hong Kong film starring Cheung Kwong-chiu.
 The Living Buddha Chikung, a 1975 Hong Kong film starring Yueh Yang.
 The Mad Monk, a 1977 Hong Kong film produced by the Shaw Brothers Studio, starring Julie Yeh Feng.
 The Mad Monk Strikes Again, a 1978 Hong Kong film produced by the Shaw Brothers Studio, starring Julie Yeh Feng.
 Xin Ji Gong Huo Fo, a 1982 Taiwanese film starring Hsu Pu-liao.
 The Mad Monk, a 1993 Hong Kong film starring Stephen Chow.
 Ji Gong: Gu Cha Fengyun, a 2010 Chinese film starring You Benchang.
 Ji Gong: Cha Yi You Dao, a 2010 Chinese film starring You Benchang.

Television series
 Xianglong Luohan, a 1984 Taiwanese television series produced by CTV, starring Hsu Pu-liao.
 Ji Gong, a 1985 Chinese television series produced by Shanghai TV and Hangzhou TV, starring You Benchang.
 Hutu Shenxian, a 1986 Taiwanese television series produced by TTV, starring Lung Kuan-wu.
 Buddha Jih, a 1986 Hong Kong television series divided into a 2 part series, produced by ATV, starring Lam Kwok-hung.
 Daxiao Ji Gong, a 1987 Taiwanese television series produced by CTS, starring Shih Ying.
 Kuaile Shenxian, a 1987 Taiwanese television series produced by TTV, starring Cheng Ping-chun.
 Ji Gong, a 1988 Chinese television series produced by Shanghai TV and Hangzhou TV, starring You Benchang and Lü Liang.
 Ji Gong Huo Fo, a 1989 Chinese television series produced by CTPC and Ningbo Film Company, starring You Benchang.
 Ji Gong Xin Zhuan, a 1991 Taiwanese television series produced by CTV, starring Ku Pao-ming.
 Ji Gong, a 1995 Taiwanese television series produced by TTV, starring Chou Ming-tseng.
The Legends of Jigong, a 1996 Singaporean television series produced by TCS (now Mediacorp), starring Xie Shaoguang.
 Ji Gong Huo Fo, a 1997 Taiwanese television series produced by CTV, starring Chou Ming-tseng and Lin You-hsing.
 The Legend of Master Chai, a 1997 Hong Kong television series produced by TVB, starring Joey Leung.
 Ji Gong You Ji, a 1998 Chinese television series produced by Zhejiang TV, starring You Benchang.

 Zen Master, a 2001 Hong Kong television series attributed from the 1986 series: Buddha Jih.produced by ATV, starring Karl Maka.
 Ji Gong, a 2007 Taiwanese television series produced by Formosa Television, starring Lung Shao-hua.
 The Legend of Crazy Monk, a three-season Chinese television series produced by Shanghai Chongyuan Cultural Company and Hangzhou Baicheng Media Company, starring Benny Chan. The three seasons were released between 2009 and 2011.
 New Mad Monk, a 2013 Chinese television series after Stephen Chow's The Mad Monk.produced by Lafeng Entertainment, starring Benny Chan.

References

External links

 Tung Cheng Yuen Buddhist Association
 
 
 In popular culture
 
 

1130 births
1209 deaths
Song dynasty Buddhists
Deified Chinese people
Buddhism in China
Rinzai Buddhists